"Good Intentions" is a song by American alternative rock band Toad the Wet Sprocket. It is included on both the band's album In Light Syrup and the Friends soundtrack, Friends Original TV Soundtrack. This version was recorded in January 1991 during the sessions for the band's third album fear but was not included because they felt it was too catchy and sounded like an obvious "hit single".

Background

Singer Glen Phillips said the song was about "General misunderstandings. Operating on the edge of 'moral okayness' as a young person. Flirting or something. ... I think it was about that, like pushing those edges and everybody trying to figure out where they stand in a relationship that way."

Track listing
"Good Intentions" – 3:25

Charts

Weekly charts

Year-end charts

Use in media
The song appears on the soundtrack of the television sitcom Friends.

References

External links
 

Toad the Wet Sprocket songs
1995 singles
Songs written by Glen Phillips (singer)
1991 songs
Columbia Records singles